International Angiology is the official medical journal of the International Union of Angiology, the International Union of Phlebology and the Central European Vascular Forum, published for them by Edizioni Minerva Medica of Turin.

Angiology
Publications established in 1982
Cardiology journals
Bimonthly journals
English-language journals